The 1982 NCAA Division II men's basketball tournament involved 32 schools playing in a single-elimination tournament to determine the national champion of men's NCAA Division II college basketball as a culmination of the 1981–82 NCAA Division II men's basketball season. It was won by the University of the District of Columbia and UDC's Michael Britt was the Most Outstanding Player.

This was the first NCAA D-II basketball tournament to contain the word "Men's" in its official title, as the NCAA held its first D-II women's championship in that season.

Regional participants

*denotes tie

Regionals

South Atlantic - Emmitsburg, Maryland 
Location: Memorial Gym Host: Mount Saint Mary's College and Seminary

Third Place - Virginia State 84, Virginia Union 82

East - Bloomsburg, Pennsylvania 
Location: Nelson Field House Host: Bloomsburg State College

Third Place - Edinboro 56, Monmouth 53

North Central - Grand Forks, North Dakota 
Location: Hyslop Sports Center Host: University of North Dakota

Third Place - Lewis 76, Eastern Montana 70

West - Bakersfield, California 
Location: unknown Host: California State University, Bakersfield

Third Place - Alaska–Anchorage 89, San Francisco State 84

South Central - Warrensburg, Missouri 
Location: CMSU Fieldhouse Host: Central Missouri State University

Third Place - Central Missouri State 70, UCF 62

South - Lakeland, Florida 
Location: Jenkins Field House Host: Florida Southern College

Third Place - St. Thomas 89, NW Missouri State 83

Great Lakes - Owensboro, Kentucky 
Location: Owensboro Sportscenter Host: Kentucky Wesleyan College

Third Place - Wright State 87, Bellarmine 86

New England - North Easton, Massachusetts 
Location: Merkert Gymnasium Host: Stonehill College

Third Place - Springfield 73, Stonehill 72

*denotes each overtime played

National Quarterfinals

National Finals - Springfield, Massachusetts
Location: Springfield Civic Center Hosts: American International College and Springfield College

Third Place - Kentucky Wesleyan 77, Cal State Bakersfield 66

*denotes each overtime played

All-tournament team
 Michael Britt (District of Columbia)
 John Ebeling (Florida Southern)
 Dwight Higgs (Kentucky Wesleyan)
 Earl Jones (District of Columbia)
 Wayne McDaniel (Cal State Bakersfield)

See also
1982 NCAA Division I men's basketball tournament
1982 NCAA Division II women's basketball tournament
1982 NCAA Division III men's basketball tournament
1982 NAIA Basketball Tournament

References

Sources
 2010 NCAA Men's Basketball Championship Tournament Records and Statistics: Division II men's basketball Championship
 1982 NCAA Division II men's basketball tournament jonfmorse.com

NCAA Division II men's basketball tournament
Tournament
NCAA Division II basketball tournament
NCAA Division II basketball tournament